Kappa Velorum (κ Velorum, abbreviated Kappa Vel, κ Vel; proper name Markeb ) is a binary star system in the southern constellation of Vela. The two components are designated Kappa Velorum A and B.

The apparent visual magnitude is 2.48, making it readily visible to the naked eye in the southern hemisphere. It forms part of an asterism known as the False Cross along with Delta Velorum, Iota Carinae and Epsilon Carinae, so called because it is sometimes mistaken for the Southern Cross, causing errors in astronavigation.

Nomenclature

κ Velorum (Latinised to Kappa Velorum) is the system's Bayer designation. The designations of the two components as Kappa Velorum A and B derives from the convention used by the Washington Multiplicity Catalog (WMC) for multiple star systems, and adopted by the International Astronomical Union (IAU).

The system had a traditional name Markab, from the Arabic مركب, markab meaning "something to ride". It was often spelled Markeb to distinguish it from similarly named stars such as Alpha Pegasi. In 2016, the IAU organized a Working Group on Star Names (WGSN) to catalog and standardize proper names for stars. The WGSN approved the name Markeb for Kappa Velorum on 5 September 2017. Markab had previously been approved for Alpha Pegasi on 30 June 2016. Both are now included in the List of IAU-approved Star Names.

Properties

Kappa Velorum is a spectroscopic binary system consisting of a pair of stars that complete an orbit around each other with a period of 116.65 days and an eccentricity of 0.19. Because the individual stars have not been resolved, further details of the orbit have not yet been determined. The combined stellar classification of the pair is B2 IV, which matches the class of a B-type subgiant star that has exhausted the hydrogen at its core and begun to evolve into a giant. It has an estimated size of 6.9 times the Sun's radius.

The system is only a couple of degrees from the south celestial pole of Mars, so it could therefore be considered the southern polar star of that planet. Due to precession of the equinoxes, it will be the closest bright star of note to the south celestial pole of Earth in the period surrounding 9000 AD.

Interstellar medium 

Analysis of the spectrum of Kappa Velorum shows absorption lines due to the interstellar medium between Earth and the star. Observation of these features over many years has shown that the lines vary in strength, probably caused by a small dense cloud extending 10²–10³ au moving across the line of sight.

References

External links
 "The path of the Southern Celestial Pole": The System of W. B. Yeats's A Vision  Diagram of the southern precession circle, showing Markeb as the South Pole Star in 9000 AD.
 

Velorum, Kappa
081188
045941
3734
Vela (constellation)
B-type subgiants
Spectroscopic binaries
Durchmusterung objects
Southern pole stars